Vacchani may refer to the following in India :

 the Gujarati former petty princely state Chamardi
 the Gujarati village and former petty princely state Panchavda
 the Indian actor Ajit Vacchani